Victor Wetterström (27 August 1884 – 11 May 1956) was a Swedish curler who won a silver medal at the 1924 Winter Olympics in Chamonix. In 1944 he became the first recipient of the Medal of Merit of the Swedish Curling Association; he was also awarded the Polish Cross of Merit, the Austrian Red Cross Gold Medal and the Order of Vasa. Wetterström worked in the shoe trading business, and had four daughters with his wife Maria.

References

External links

1884 births
1956 deaths
Sportspeople from Stockholm
Swedish male curlers
Olympic curlers of Sweden
Olympic silver medalists for Sweden
Curlers at the 1924 Winter Olympics
Medalists at the 1924 Winter Olympics
Swedish curling champions